PMDC may refer to:

Pakistan Mineral Development Corporation
People's Movement for Democratic Change, a political party in Sierra Leone
Permanent magnet direct current, a type of electric motor
Portable Modular Data Center